Udaya News (also known as Udaya Varthegalu) was Kannada language's first News Channel and belonged to the Sun Network. The channel ceased its operation after 19 years on 24 October 2017 due to mounting losses and competition. Udaya News was shut down on 1 February 2019.

“We have been operating Udaya News division for the last 19 years and have made substantial investments in building the news business in Karnataka. Despite our best efforts, the news division has been incurring substantial losses over the past couple of years. Further, given the competition Udaya News has faced, the viewership share of Udaya News is also relatively low and that has further worsened the situation. Considering the above, we are compelled to close down Udaya News for business reasons as we are not able to justify the insurmountable losses which have been accumulated and which it continues to incur.” read the official statement by the broadcaster.

The broadcaster also shut down Gemini News, another regional news channel, for the same reasons

Some of the other channels from Sun Network group are Udaya TV, Udaya Music (a 24-hour Kannada music channel) and Udaya Movies  (a Kannada Movie Channel), Udaya Comedy (a 24-hour Kannada Comedy channel) and Chintu TV (Kannada children's channel).

See also
List of Kannada-language television channels
Television in India
Media in Karnataka
Media of India

References

External links
 Official Website
 View Schedule

Kannada-language television channels
Television channels and stations established in 2008
Television stations in Bangalore
Sun Group
1998 establishments in Karnataka
Television channels and stations disestablished in 2019